John Beugo (7 May 1759 – 13 December 1841) was a Scottish engraver and printmaker. His most famous work was the engraved version of Alexander Nasmyth's portrait of Robert Burns.

Biography

Beugo was born in Edinburgh on 7 May 1759. 

He was a prosperous reproductive engraver who made prints after the likes of Henry Raeburn, Joshua Reynolds and Alexander Nasmyth. He also made prints after the anatomical works of John Bell. Beugo became the teacher of engraver Robert Charles Bell. He was friends with and engraved portraits of the poet Robert Burns. He published a book called "Poetry, Miscellaneous and Dramatic, by an Artist" in 1797. Buego also made notes for the Commercial and the British Linen Banks. He married Elizabeth McDowall in 1808 and together they had one daughter. 

His address in 1832 is known to have been 54 South Bridge in the Old Town.

He died in Edinburgh on 13 December 1841 and was buried in Greyfriar's Churchyard. His grave lies to the south side of the church.

Gallery

References

External links

1759 births
1841 deaths
18th-century engravers
19th-century engravers
18th-century Scottish people
19th-century Scottish people
Scottish engravers
Scottish printmakers
Burials at Greyfriars Kirkyard